Franco Simon (born 7 October 1974) is an Indian singer and music composer from Kerala. He has sung around 150 Malayalam films songs and 1500 album songs in 5 different languages. He is the nephew of well-known Indian film composer Ouseppachan. He is a recipient of GMMA award and multiple Yuvaprathibha Puraskar for his soundtrack albums.

Biography

Franco Simon Neelankavil was born to Simon N.P. and Alice M.L on 7 October 1974 in Thrissur, Kerala, India. He is the oldest of four children. According to his parents, he has exhibited great interest in music and started singing at a very early age. He had his first on-stage performance when he was only 4 years old and has since won many awards and competitions. Franco completed his B.A. in music from Madras University.

Franco's first cinematic song was En Karalil (Raakshasi) from the movie Nammal in 2002. In 2005, Franco formed a band called Band Seven with Stephen Devassy and Sangeeth Pavithran. An Indian pop band, they released a Hindi album titled Yeh Zindagani. In association with Kosmic Music, Franco has composed numerous Hindu devotional songs in Telugu, Kannada and Sanskrit languages.  Two of the hit songs from the very popular 2006 Malayalam album Chempakame brought his talents to the limelight when the album stayed on the top requested list for over 2 years. His Christian meditation album Moran Amekh in Sanskrit is unique in the world of meditation music.

Partial Discography

Languages sung
 
 Malayalam
 Tamil
 Telugu
 Hindi
 English
 Sanskrit
 
Popular Songs in Malayalam Films
 
 Rakshasi (Nammal )
 Dhumthanakkidi Dhumma ( Mullavalliyum Thenmavum )
 Pineapple Penne ( Vellinakshathram )
 Kanaponnum thedi ( Chanthupottu )
 Panchara chiri kondu ( Merikkundoru Kunjadu )
 Avani ppadam Poothallo ( Maya Mohini )
 Januariyil ( Ayalum Njanum Thammil )
 Velli Chirakukal ( Chapters )
 Appakkale ( Polytechnic )
 Hai Hai Hailesa ( Pullipulikalum Attinkuttiyum ) 
 Vasoottan ( Jamna Pyari )
 Bum Hare ( Double barrel )
 Kinavile ( Pranchiyettan ) 
 Enne ninakkinnu Priyamalle ( youth festival ) 
 Othu pidichal ( 3 dots ) 
 
Popular Songs in Tamil Films
 
 Ullahi Ullahi ( Lesa Lesa )
 Do Do doda ( Ullam Ketkumae )
 Neruppe ( Vettaiyaadu Vilaiyaadu )
 Theye Theeye ( Maattrraan )
 Title song (Thakadimi tha) 
 Title song (Thavam) 
 
Popular songs in Telugu Films
 
 Ready
 Current
 Raghavan
 Brothers 
 
Popular Songs In Hindi Film
 
 Freeky Chakra
 
Popular songs in English Film
 
 Dam 999
 
Lead Singer in Bands
 
 Band Seven
 Road House
 Q8 Band
 
Popular Malayalam Albums
 
 Sundariye vaa (Malayalam album)
 Chempakame (Malayalam pop album)
 Akkara Pacha
 Belief ( Gospel Album )
 4U ( Band Seven Album )
 Yeh Zindagani ( Hindi album )

Sanskrit Album

 MORAN AMEKH ( Christian Meditation Album in Sanskrit ) 2016

References

External links
 https://www.youtube.com/watch?v=Wp2PI4q8EzI

1974 births
Living people
St. Thomas College, Thrissur alumni
Film musicians from Kerala
Singers from Thrissur
Indian male playback singers